Liu Jianying (born 17 October 1970) is a Chinese female former long-distance runner who competed over distances from 1500 metres up to the half marathon. She represented her country at the 1997 World Championships in Athletics, placing sixth in the 5000 metres. She competed for Asia at the 1994 IAAF World Cup, finishing fourth in the 3000 metres. He greatest individual success was a gold medal in the 1500 m at the 1997 East Asian Games.

Liu was a frequent member of China's team for international ekiden races, including the 1998 IAAF World Road Relay Championships, Yokohama International Women's Ekiden (1992, 1993, 1994, 1997, 1998), International Chiba Ekiden (1996, 1997), and 1992 Beijing International Women's Ekiden. She was the 1997 winner of the Sendai Half Marathon with a career best of 73:15 minutes. She was a finalist at the National Games of China over 10,000 metres in 1993 and 5000 m in 1997.

International competitions

References

External links

Living people
1970 births
Chinese female long-distance runners
Chinese female middle-distance runners
World Athletics Championships athletes for China
Competitors at the 1998 Goodwill Games